The Rat Pack was a group of entertainers in the 1950s and 1960s comprising primarily Frank Sinatra, Dean Martin, Sammy Davis Jr., Peter Lawford, and Joey Bishop; as well as others

Rat Pack may also refer to:

Entertainment

Television 

"Rat Pack" (The Sopranos), an episode from Season 5 of The Sopranos television series
The Rat Pack, Verminous Skumm's henchmen from the animated series Captain Planet and the Planeteers
The Rat Pack (TV series), a 2009 British reality television series following London-based pest controllers that aired on BBC One

Music 

 The Rattpack, a group of artists lead by Logic
 The Rat Pack: Live From Las Vegas, a 2000 stage musical

Other 

 The Rat Pack, stories in Battle Picture Weekly by Gerry Finley-Day and Carlos Ezquerra
 The Rat Pack (film), a 1998 TV film about the above-mentioned entertainers

Sports 

 The Rat Pack, a professional wrestling stable active in the Mid-South Wrestling promotion during 1982 and 1983, comprising Ted DiBiase, Jim Duggan and Matt Borne
 The Rat Pack, a group of racing drivers active in the late 1980s and early 1990s, comprising Julian Bailey, Mark Blundell, Martin Donnelly, Johnny Herbert, Damon Hill and Perry McCarthy
The student section for the St. John's University Johnnies Football team

Other uses 

Liberal Party of Canada Rat Pack, a group of Canadian Liberal Members of Parliament
 Commonwealth military colloquial for Ration Packs, individual meals for one soldier in field conditions